Li Xiaoxia was the defending champion but lost in the semifinals.

Ding Ning captured the title by defeating Liu Shiwen with 7–11, 15–13, 11–7, 11–9, 9–11, 4–11, 11–8.

Seeds
Matches were best of 7 games in qualification and in the 128-player sized main draw.

  Ding Ning (champion)
  Liu Shiwen (final)
  Li Xiaoxia (semifinals)
  Feng Tianwei (quarterfinals)
  Kasumi Ishikawa (third round)
  Zhu Yuling (quarterfinals)
  Wu Yang (quarterfinals)
  Ai Fukuhara (second round)
  Seo Hyo-won (second round)
  Liu Jia (first round)
  Sayaka Hirano (third round)
  Doo Hoi Kem (third round)
  Mima Ito (quarterfinals)
  Yu Mengyu (fourth round)
  Elizabeta Samara (third round)
  Yang Ha-eun (fourth round)
  Petrissa Solja (second round)
  Ri Myong-sun (third round)
  Li Jie (fourth round)
  Melek Hu (second round)
  Lee Ho Ching (second round)
  Jiang Huajun  (fourth round)
  Shen Yanfei (third round)
  Miu Hirano (third round)
  Chen Szu-yu (third round)
  Li Jiao (third round)
  Kristin Silbereisen (first round)
  Cheng I-ching (fourth round)
  Irene Ivancan (fourth round)
  Li Qian (third round)
  Tie Ya Na (third round)
  Lee I-chen (second round)
  Ri Mi-gyong (second round)
  Iveta Vacenovská (second round)
  Margaryta Pesotska (third round)
  Sabine Winter (second round)
  Tetyana Sorochynska (fourth round)
  Bernadette Szőcs (second round)
  Polina Mikhailova (second round)
  Kim Jong (second round)
  Natalia Partyka (second round)
  Carole Grundisch (second round)
  Park Young-sook (third round)
  Matilda Ekholm (fourth round)
  Ni Xialian (second round)
  Yana Noskova (second round)
  Barbora Balážová (second round)
  Rūta Paškauskienė (second round)
  Camelia Postoaca (second round)
  Britt Eerland (second round)
  Nina Mittelham (second round)
  Tian Yuan (second round)
  Xian Yi Fang (second round)
  Katarzyna Grzybowska (third round)
  Maria Dolgikh (third round)
  Renata Štrbíková (second round)
  Zhang Mo (second round)
  Ganna Gaponova (third round)
  Sara Ramírez (first round)
  Dina Meshref (first round)
  Yulia Prokhorova (first round)
  Galia Dvorak (second round)
  Li Isabelle (first round)
  Nanthana Komwong (first round)

Draw

Finals

Top half

Section 1

Section 2

Section 3

Section 4

Bottom half

Section 5

Section 6

Section 7

Section 8

References

External links
Main draw
Qualifying draw

Women's singles
World